Buenavista is a commuter railway station in Mexico City. The station provided intercity train services from Ferrocarriles Nacionales de México. Since June 2008, the station serves as the terminus of the Tren Suburbano commuter rail service. Atop the ground-level station and tracks is one of the city's largest shopping malls, Forum Buenavista.

The adjacent Buenavista metro station is also the terminus of Mexico City Metro Line B, that runs from this station to Ciudad Azteca in the State of Mexico. Additionally, three Metrobús lines serve the area.

History

Originally, the station was owned by Ferrocarriles Nacionales de México (N de M), but after the company was privatized, the station was closed. Ferrocarriles Suburbanos acquired the station and was remodeled beginning in 2007 in preparation for the launch of commuter rail service to Cuautitlán Izcalli in the State of Mexico.

In 2012 a large enclosed shopping mall was opened on three floors topping the ground-level station and tracks, Forum Buenavista, anchored by a Cinépolis multiplex cinema and a Sears.

In addition to being a terminus of Metro Line B, the railway station is also a stop for three Metrobús lines, Mexico City's bus rapid transit system.

Gallery

References

External links

Cuauhtémoc, Mexico City
Railway stations opened in 2008
Buenavista